The 2004 Libya LG Cup was an exhibition association football tournament that took place in Libya. The hosts won the tournament after beating Jordan 1–0 in the final with a goal from Nader Kara.

Participants
The participants were:

Results

Semifinals

Third place match

Final

Statistics

Goalscorers

See also
LG Cup

References

External links
Results

International association football competitions hosted by Libya
2004–05 in Libyan football
2004–05 in Jordanian football
2004–05 in Nigerian football